Mustafa Korkmaz (January 18, 1988) is a Turkish descent Dutch wheelchair basketball player and Paralympian. He competes for the Netherlands men's national wheelchair basketball team at the 2016 Summer Paralympics in Rio de Janeiro, Brazil.

He played in the 2012–13 season of the Turkish Wheelchair Basketball Super League for Galatasaray SK wheelchair basketball team in Istanbul, Turkey.

References

Living people
1988 births
Dutch people of Turkish descent
Dutch men's wheelchair basketball players
Galatasaray S.K. (wheelchair basketball) players
Paralympic wheelchair basketball players of the Netherlands
Wheelchair basketball players at the 2016 Summer Paralympics
21st-century Dutch people